Pungești is a commune in Vaslui County, Western Moldavia, Romania. It is composed of nine villages: Armășoaia, Cursești-Deal, Cursești-Vale, Hordila, Pungești, Rapșa, Siliștea, Stejaru and Toporăști.

The commune is located in the northwestern part of the county.

In late 2013, Pungești became a center of protests against shale gas exploitation through hydraulic fracturing.

Natives
 Mirela Lavric

References

Communes in Vaslui County
Localities in Western Moldavia